Jelani Woods (born October 9, 1998) is an American football tight end for the Indianapolis Colts of the National Football League (NFL). He played college football at Oklahoma State before transferring to Virginia for 2021, where he was named first-team All-ACC. Woods was drafted by the Colts in the third round of the 2022 NFL Draft.

Early years
Woods grew up in Ellenwood, Georgia, and attended Cedar Grove High School. He played quarterback and passed for 1,992 yards with 20 touchdown passes against six interceptions in his junior season. Woods was also named honorable mention All-State in basketball by The Atlanta Journal-Constitution. As a senior, he was named honorable mention All-State and first-team All-Region 5 3A after passing for 2,316 yards and 26 touchdowns. Woods was rated a three-star recruit and committed to play college football at Oklahoma State over offers from Michigan, Louisville, Kansas State, and South Carolina.

College career
Woods began his college career at Oklahoma State. He joined the team as an early enrollee and redshirted his freshman year and was moved from quarterback to tight end during the Cowboys practices leading up to the 2017 Camping World Bowl. Woods finished his redshirt freshman season with seven receptions for 120 yards and two touchdowns. As a redshirt sophomore, he caught 16 passes for 112 yards and a touchdown and was an honorable mention All-Big 12 Conference selection. Woods had eight receptions for 129 yards and a touchdown and was again named honorable mention All-Big 12 as a redshirt junior.

Following the end of the season, Woods announced he would be transferring to Virginia Cavaliers as a graduate student. He was named first-team All-Atlantic Coast Conference after catching 44 passes for 598 yards and eight touchdowns.

Professional career

Woods was drafted by the Indianapolis Colts in the third round with the 73rd overall pick in the 2022 NFL Draft. In Week 3, against the Kansas City Chiefs, Woods scored his first two professional touchdowns on his first two career receptions in a 20–17 victory.

References

Additional reading

 Andrew Moore, "Jelani Woods: Indianapolis Colts Rookie Files," Horseshoe Huddle, August 31, 2022.

External links
 Indianapolis Colts bio
Virginia Cavaliers bio
Oklahoma State Cowboys bio

1998 births
Living people
American football tight ends
Virginia Cavaliers football players
Players of American football from Georgia (U.S. state)
Oklahoma State Cowboys football players
Sportspeople from the Atlanta metropolitan area
Indianapolis Colts players